This Is Happening is the third studio album by American rock band LCD Soundsystem. It was released first on May 17, 2010, jointly through DFA and Virgin Records in the United States and Parlophone elsewhere. It was recorded over the course of 2009 and early 2010 in the Mansion recording studio in Los Angeles. The first single, "Drunk Girls", was released in April 2010, with a music video directed by Spike Jonze. 
The album is dedicated to Jerry Fuchs (1974–2009), who performed drums live with the band on occasion, as well as having a big part in associated DFA acts.

Reception 

At Metacritic, which assigns a normalised rating out of 100 to reviews from mainstream critics, This Is Happening received an average score of 84, based on 38 reviews, indicating "universal acclaim". It also achieved an ADM Rating of 7.7/10 on another review aggregator, AnyDecentMusic?.

Guardian reviewer Alexis Petridis observed that the album did not contain Sound of Silvers "startling sense of mapping out new territories", instead sticking to a template that worked "incredibly well." In his review for AllMusic, Tim Sendra had a similar opinion, stating that while This Is Happening "doesn't quite reach the monumental heights" of the band's previous album, it still provided proof that LCD Soundsystem was "one of the most exciting and interesting bands around in the 2000s." Sendra also commended Murphy's expansion as a lyricist and songwriter, and said that his production on the album "reveal[s] him at the top of his game", while Jody Rosen of Rolling Stone said that it contained some of Murphy's "most earnest, lovelorn songs." Pitchforks Ryan Dombal awarded the album a Best New Music accolade, describing it as "pretty perfect".

Accolades
This Is Happening was named the second best album of 2010 by Pitchfork. This album was number 10 on Rolling Stones list of the 30 Best Albums of 2010.

Track listing

Personnel
All personnel and credits adapted from album liner notes.

LCD Soundsystem
 James Murphy – vocals , guitar , claps , drums , bass , acoustic piano , EMS VCS3 Putney , Korg Poly Ensemble , EMS PolySynthi , EMS Synthi A , Yamaha CS-60 , Casio MT-68 , percussion , Simmons , cowbell , Roland System 100 , Synare , Wurlitzer electric piano , tambourine , Roland TR-606 , noise , glockenspiel , EML 101 , Casio CT-410V , Fun Machine , Roland TR-808 , Roland SH-101 , blocks , scraper , clapper , Moog Rogue , Moog CDX , Omnichord , vocoder , congas , snaps , Wurlitzer SideMan , Sequential Circuits Prophet-600 , Casio MT-400 , EMS VCS3 Putney programming 
 Pat Mahoney – vocals , drums 
 Nancy Whang – yells , vocals 
 Tyler Pope – bass 
 Phillip Mossman
Additional musicians
 Rayna Russom – EMS PolySynthi , vocals , whispers 
 Morgan Wiley – acoustic piano 
 Al Doyle – guitar , Yamaha CS-60 
 Jayson Green – vocals 
 Jason Disu – trombone 
 Matt Thornley – snaps 
 Matthew Cash – EMS VCS3 Putney 

Production
 James Murphy – production, mixing 
 Dave Sardy – mixing 
 Bob Weston – mastering
 Matthew Thornley – engineering assistance
 Gunnar Bjerk – engineering assistance
 Alec Gomez – engineering assistance
 Andy Brohard – mix assistance
 Alec Gomez – mix assistance
 Cameron Barton – mix assistance
Release
 Keith Wood – management
 Michael Vadino – art direction
 Brett Tabolt – design
 Ruvan Wijesooriya – cover photos
 Craig E. Averill – legal
 Matthew Cash – human

Charts
The album debuted at number ten on the Billboard 200 in its first week on sale, selling approximately 31,000 copies. It also topped [[Dance/Electronic Albums|Billboard'''s Dance/Electronic Albums]] chart the same week of its debut, which dethroned Lady Gaga's The Fame'' from its five-month reign on the chart for one week. As of January 2016, the album has sold about 211,000 copies in United States, according to Nielsen SoundScan. About 86,800 of those are physical copies, and about 124,500 of those are digital copies.

Weekly charts

Year-end charts

Certifications

Notes and references
Notes

References

External links
 

2010 albums
LCD Soundsystem albums
DFA Records albums
Virgin Records albums
Albums recorded at The Mansion (recording studio)